Batty Bay is a narrow bay in the Qikiqtaaluk Region, Nunavut, Canada. It is an arm of Prince Regent Inlet on the eastern side of Somerset Island.

History
It was an area frequented by Arctic explorers such as Sir John Franklin and Captain John Ross, who left his boats there in 1832. The explorer William Kennedy wintered there in 1852.

References

Bays of Qikiqtaaluk Region